Kilvelur (SC) is a state assembly constituency in Tamil Nadu, India newly formed after constituency delimitations 2008. It is included in the Nagapattinam parliamentary constituency. It comprises kilvelur, keezhayur and a part of Nagapattinam panchayat union. It is one of the 234 State Legislative Assembly Constituencies in Tamil Nadu in India.

Members of the Legislative Assembly

Election Results

2021

2016

2011

References 

Assembly constituencies of Tamil Nadu